Sadomba cattle project is a project started by the Sadomba (women) community with the Ministry of Women Affairs Gender and Community Development in its Women empowerment and Community Development Programmes. Manicaland Province mobilized communities for cattle production in an effort to increase the national herd after devastating droughts and the country’s economic crisis. This would also address poverty issues in communities and enhance food security. Sadomba Project in Nyanga was one project identified by the province and was started by 29 members (19 women and 7 men) in Ward 24.

Sadomba is a village in Nyanga District in Manicaland Province. The village is about 20 kilometres west of Nyanga town.

Beginnings

Community members came together and contributed one animal each to the project with the idea of starting a cattle fattening project. The members are newly resettled farmers who took advantage of their white neighbor farmer who was running a successful cattle project in the area. At provincial level, the Ministry of Women Affairs felt all the need to support the group for members had shown commitment after realizing a herd of 98 from such humble beginnings. The Ministry with various stakeholders like Agritex. Department of Livestock, Local Government, International Rescue Committee etc. held several meetings with the group in trying to assist members.

Scaling up

It became exciting to the province because all efforts to the projects were in line with the Rural Women’s Day. Theme of Poverty and Hunger Eradication. which recognizes rural women’s importance in enhancing agricultural and rural development which is exactly what the Project is aiming to achieve

Head office visit

The head office visit was an eye opener for the Permanent Secretary who had once visited a cattle project in the Victoria Falls by Allan Savory. She suggested the provincial team get a learning tour of Allan Savory’s project in Victoria Falls. A visit by the provincial team of Ministry officers, Officers from Agritex, project members (the rural Women) and local leaders was arranged for 10–14 August 2011 at the Holistic management center in Victoria falls. This was funded by the Ministry and IRC with the understanding that communities benefits when women actively participate in decision-making about community development priorities. After a week of learning Holistic Management by Allan Savory (at the Savory Institute) the Province decided to adopt the same concept for Sadomba cattle Project for they identified a lot of benefits coming with Holistic Management.

Village set-up
The Sadomba people are newly resettled farmers who were settled under the Zimbabwe land reform programme. Many people have been settled in Sadomba under government's A.1 land resettlement scheme.

Benefits of holistic management 
The Sadomba Community has since engaged itself in implementing holistic management as the programme is now being implemented in three villages.
The whole idea for the Sadomba Community is now to have the best approach to managing resources that builds biodiversity, improves production, generates financial strength, enhances sustainability, and improves the quality of life for the community. The Province has cascaded this concept to all Districts in the Province.

Conclusion 

This concept is now targeting the whole community and not only those women who started the cattle project. Communities have seen the benefits through improvements in their yields.The Ministry of Women Affairs Manicaland Province is also trying to implement the project in all the districts.

See also
 Districts of Zimbabwe

References

Nyanga District
Manicaland Province